Guan Yu (died 220) was a general during the late Han dynasty period, serving the warlord Liu Bei. He has become a legendary and mythical figure in Chinese culture, and has often been referred to as Guan Gong (literally "Lord Guan").

Guan Gong may also refer to:
Guan Gong (TV series), a 1996 Taiwanese TV series starring Kou Feng as Guan Yu
The Legend of Guan Gong, a 2002 Chinese TV series starring Wang Yingquan as Guan Yu

See also
Yuncheng Guangong Airport, an airport in Yuncheng, Shanxi, China, named after Guan Yu